Oreol Camejo Durruthy (born July 22, 1986) is a volleyball player from Cuba, who plays as an outside hitter for Turkish club Ziraat Bankası. He became Best Setter at the first 2008 Olympic Qualification Tournament in Düsseldorf, where Cuba ended up in second place and missed qualification for the 2008 Summer Olympics in Beijing, PR China.

Career
Camejo won the bronze medal in the 2005 America's Cup and placed 15th place in the 2006 FIVB World Championship. He won the bronze medal in the 2007 America's Cup. With his national team he did not qualify for the 2008 Summer Olympics after placing second in the qualifying tournament.

In 2018 Camejo was given a Russian citizenship while he was playing for Russian club Zenit Saint Petersburg.

References

External links
 FIVB profile

1986 births
Living people
Cuban men's volleyball players
Volleyball players at the 2007 Pan American Games
Place of birth missing (living people)
Pan American Games medalists in volleyball
Pan American Games bronze medalists for Cuba
VC Zenit Saint Petersburg players
Naturalised citizens of Russia
Medalists at the 2007 Pan American Games